Kokas is a surname of several origins. Notable people with this surname include:

Andreas Kokas, Greek footballer
Dimos Kokas, Greek footballer
Katalin Kokas, Hungarian violinist
Leonidas Kokas, Greek weightlifter
Péter Kokas, Hungarian rower
Viktória Kokas, Hungarian handballer